Alex Reed or variant, (man or woman) may refer to:

Alec Reed (born 1934), British businessman
Alexander Wyclif Reed (1908-1979), New Zealand author
James Alexander Reed (1861-1944), American politician
Julian Alexander Arnott Reed (born 1936), Canadian politician
Lexi Reed, a character from A.N.T. Farm

See also 
Alec Reed Academy, British school of Studies
Reed
 Reed Alexander (born 1994), American actor
 Reed Alexander (Canadian football) (born 1984), Canadian CFL football player
 Alyson Reed (born 1958), American dancer
 Allison Reed (born 1994), American ice dancer
Other
 Alex Reid (disambiguation)
 Alexander Read (disambiguation)